The Metropolitan Transport Authority (ATM) is a public consortium intended to coordinate the operation and project the expansion of the public transport system in the Barcelona metropolitan area. It is made up of the Government of Catalonia and local administrations. It has been known as ATM Àrea de Barcelona since 2003 to differentiate it from the other existing Catalan public transport authorities in the Girona, Camp de Tarragona and Lleida areas, which are also identified as ATM. , the ATM-managed public transport system comprises 50 different operating companies and serves 346 municipalities, accounting for a population of over 5.7 million.

Created in 1997, the ATM has since developed an Integrated Fare System (STI) based on concentric fare zones. There currently exist about 80 different types of multiple-time tickets or unlimited passes for use on the STI, all of which allow free-of-charge interchange between transport modes in a single trip. In 2012, it was announced that the ATM was planning to upgrade the current magnetic stripe-based technology used on the STI to a contactless smart card validation system known as T-mobilitat, reducing all the existing ATM cards to one.

Integrated Fare System
The Integrated Fare System (STI) is the fare zone-based ticketing system run by the ATM allowing unified public transport fare integration throughout the Barcelona metropolitan area and beyond. The STI consists of six concentric fare zones centered in Barcelona, numbered 1–6, which are further divided into sectors lettered A–H. The overall system virtually reaches the entire province of Barcelona, as well as adjacent parts of the Girona and Tarragona provinces, serving a total number of 15 comarques (counties) and 346 municipalities, that is a population of over 5.7 million. Although the Berguedà and Ripollès comarques were incorporated in the STI on 1 January 2015, they do not appear on official maps because of their distinct operation. The STI uses magnetic stripe-based technology.

Almost all public transport services within the STI are fare-integrated, with the exceptions of tourist-oriented services such as the Aerobús express bus to Barcelona–El Prat Airport, the Tramvia Blau or the Montserrat Rack Railway and its associated funiculars. All major railway systems in the Barcelona area are fare-integrated, including the Barcelona Metro, the Trambaix and Trambesòs light rail–tram systems, the Rodalies de Catalunya-operated Barcelona commuter rail service, as well as the entire Barcelona–Vallès and Llobegat–Anoia lines. The metro and the light rail–tram systems are entirely within fare zone 1. Nevertheless, there are the following exceptions:

 Barcelona Metro: the T-10 multiple-time ticket (see below) is not accepted at the stations serving Barcelona–El Prat Airport—Airport T1 and Airport T2 stations on Barcelona Metro line 9 (L9 Sud). Nevertheless, the rest of fare-integrated cards are valid.
 Rodalies de Catalunya: its Barcelona commuter rail service also uses its own fare zone system for use with its non-integrated tickets. Although its fare zones are almost identical to those of the STI, they differ at some locations such as at Barcelona–El Prat Airport, thus creating differences on the prices for the same trip.

There are eight basic types of fare-integrated cards—the T-10, T-50/30, T-70/30, T-Mes, T-Jove, T-Trimestre, T-Dia and T-16—, all of which are multiple-time tickets or unlimited passes allowing free-of-charge interchange between transport modes in 1 hour and 25 minutes within one fare zone (plus 15 minutes for each additional zone). Single tickets are not fare-integrated and thus they do not allow interchange between transport modes or operating companies. All fare-integrated cards are identified with letter T followed by a hyphen ("T-") before a distinct name. There currently exist about 80 types of fare-integrated cards, depending on the number of fare zones permitted to cross, their validity period as well as the existence of fare reductions. Non-personalised fare-integrated cards can be purchased at railway and bus stations, at tram stops, at customer service points of the integrated companies, at CaixaBank cash machines, as well as at newsagent's shops and a number of small shops.

The eight basic fare-integrated cards have the following features:

The regular fare-integrated cards are not valid in the Berguedà and Ripollès comarques due to the limitations of magnetic stripe-based technology. Dedicated multiple-time tickets can be purchased for use on trips between Berguedà and Bages, Berguedà and Barcelona, and Ripollès and Barcelona. Fares on such trips are calculated as if these comarques formed an outer seventh fare zone. A T-10 multiple-time ticket for use within fare zone 1 is also included with the dedicated card. A one- or two-zone T-10 card can be used on trips within each of the comarques, though interchanges between transport modes are not permitted.

The fares for each type of card are calculated according to the number of fare zones crossed. Regarding unlimited passes, the first fare zone in which the pass is validated will determine the number of fare zones permitted to cross with that pass. Since fares are updated on 1 January of each year, the multiple-time tickets purchased the previous year expire on 28–29 February (depending on the year), whilst unlimited passes expire on 31 March.

The 2017 fares (excluding reduced fares for large and single-parent families, as well as unemployed people) are as follows:

Notes

References

External links

 T-16. Targeta de transport públic.. Dedicated website with information on the T-16 card. 

Public transport authorities of Catalonia
Transport in Alt Penedès
Transport in Anoia
Transport in Bages
Transport in Baix Penedès
Transport in Barcelonès
Transport in Baix Llobregat
Transport in Berguedà
Transport in Garraf
Transport in Maresme
Transport in Moianès
Transport in Osona
Transport in Ripollès
Transport in Selva
Transport in Vallès Occidental
Transport in Vallès Oriental